Marvin Obando Obando  (born 4 April 1960 in Puntarenas Province) is a former Costa Rican football player who played most of his career for Herediano.

Born in Palmar Sur, Obando played a total of 21 seasons in the Primera Division of Costa Rica between 1979 and 2000, and participated in 685 football games. He is the Costa Rican footballer with the most games played, surpassing Julio Fuller by 1 game. He scored 70 goals in the process.

Club career
Obando holds the record as the most-capped player in the Costa Rican Primera División with 685 appearances. He made his professional debut on 22 July 1979 for Herediano against Municipal Puntarenas and scored his first goal on 9 September 1979 against San José. He played from 1979 to 2000 with Herediano, scoring 48 goals for them in 480 matches, San Carlos, Cartaginés, Saprissa, Ramonense, Turrialba and Municipal Puntarenas.

International career
Obando made his debut for Costa Rica in a March 1980 friendly match against Honduras and competed at the 1984 Summer Olympics.

He was part of the national team squad, that played in the 1990 FIFA World Cup held in Italy. The defender collected 51 caps, scoring 1 goal for the Tico's.

He played his final international on 19 January 1994 against Norway.

International goals
Scores and results list Costa Rica's goal tally first.

Managerial career
He has moved into the coaching side of the game currently coaching a 2nd division team in Costa Rica (Barrio Mexico).
Also, he is now training a new soccer academy for kids of 14 years, called Buffalos Soccer Academy in Costa Rica. He works with Roberto Castro.

Personal life
He has two kids; a son who is also named Marvin and a daughter named Paola.

Marvin Jr. currently plays for Heredia in the Costa Rican 1st Division, he debuted with Heredia when he was 17 years old.

References

External links
 

1960 births
Living people
People from Puntarenas Province
Association football defenders
Costa Rican footballers
Costa Rica international footballers
1990 FIFA World Cup players
Olympic footballers of Costa Rica
Footballers at the 1980 Summer Olympics
Footballers at the 1984 Summer Olympics
C.S. Herediano footballers
A.D. San Carlos footballers
C.S. Cartaginés players
Deportivo Saprissa players
A.D. Ramonense players
Puntarenas F.C. players
CONCACAF Championship-winning players